Nataka Kalasarathy, is the title awarded annually by Parthasarathy Swami Sabha to a dramatist. It confers a shawl, a citation, a medallion with a cash purse of Rs. 5,000

Recipients

2002 Sudharani Raghupathy
2003 K.S. Nagarajan
2005 S. Ve. Shekher
2006 Raadhu
2007 Koothapiran
2008 Y. Gee. Mahendra
2009 Crazy Mohan 
2010 A.R. Srinivasan
2011 Kovai Padhu 
2012 T. V. Varadarajan
2014 T D Sundarrajan
 Kathadi Ramamurthy

References

Indian art awards
Year of establishment missing